EPT may refer to:

Science and technology
 Extended Page Table, in Intel x86 microprocessors
 Ethanolaminephosphotransferase, an enzyme
 Ethylpropyltryptamine, a psychedelic drug
 Ephemeroptera, Plecoptera, and Trichoptera, used to test water quality

Other uses
 CaMLA English Placement Test, a language proficiency test
 Effective performance time, in aviation medicine
 Electroputere, a Romanian rolling stock manufacturer
 Epsilon Pi Tau, an honor society
 European Poker Tour
 Estrogen Progestin Therapy, a Hormone replacement therapy
 Hellenic Broadcasting Corporation, the public broadcaster of Greece
 Tunisia Polytechnic School